Feliciano Ángel Perducca (9 June 1901 – 22 August 1976) was an Argentine football forward who played for the Argentina national team.

Perducca started his career in 1923 playing for Temperley. He joined Racing Club de Avellaneda around 1928 and later in his career he played for Talleres de Remedios de Escalada. Perducca played five times for Argentina, he played in Copa América 1926 and at the 1928 Olympic games.

References

External links
profile

1901 births
1976 deaths
Argentine footballers
Racing Club de Avellaneda footballers
Talleres de Remedios de Escalada footballers
Footballers at the 1928 Summer Olympics
Olympic footballers of Argentina
Olympic silver medalists for Argentina
Argentina international footballers
Olympic medalists in football
Club Atlético Temperley footballers
Association football forwards
Medalists at the 1928 Summer Olympics